Alcmene may refer to:

 Alcmene, mother of Heracles in Greek mythology
 82 Alkmene, the asteroid 
 Alkmene (apple)
 Alkmene (opera), the opera by Giselher Klebe
 HMS Alcmene, one of several ships of the British Royal Navy
 French frigate Alcmène (1774)
 French frigate Alcmène (1811)

See also 
 Alcmena (disambiguation)